Passive Underwater Fire Control Feasibility System (or Study) (PUFFS) was a passive sonar system for submarines. It was also equipped on the nuclear-powered . It was also installed on the USS Thomas Edison (SSBN-610) but never achieved operational status. Its transducers can be seen on pictures of the vessel. A version known as "Micropuffs" was fitted on s for the Royal Australian Navy, and as Type 2041 on the Upholder-class for the British Royal Navy. This class still serves in the Royal Canadian Navy as the Victoria class, where Micropuffs is known as BQG-501. The system was notable for three tall, fin-like domes topside, except on Micropuffs installations. The system was retained on several submarines transferred by the US to foreign navies. It was associated with long-range passive detection of targets for the Mark 45 nuclear torpedo and other weapons. Most submarines backfitted with it were also lengthened 12–16 feet to accommodate additional electronics and plotting rooms. With the exception of the four Canadian Victoria-class submarines, all PUFFS-equipped submarines have been disposed of or preserved as museum ships.

See also 
 Greater Underwater Propulsion Power Program (GUPPY)

References 

 
Sub vs Sub, Cdr R Compton Hall, Orion Books, 1989

Military sonar equipment of the United States
Submarine warfare
Anti-submarine warfare